Eliseo Rivero Pérez (born 27 December 1957) is a former Uruguayan footballer. He played for the club C.A. Peñarol.

Rivero made seven appearances for the Uruguay national football team from 1983 to 1986, and played at the 1977 FIFA World Youth Championship and the 1986 FIFA World Cup.

References

1957 births
Living people
Uruguayan footballers
Uruguayan expatriate footballers
Uruguay international footballers
Uruguay under-20 international footballers
Uruguayan Primera División players
Peñarol players
Danubio F.C. players
Defensor Sporting players
Club Atlético Platense footballers
Expatriate footballers in Argentina
1986 FIFA World Cup players

Association football goalkeepers